The River Main or Maine is a river in Northern Ireland, flowing through County Antrim.

Former Prime Minister of Northern Ireland Terence O'Neill took the title "Baron O'Neill of the Maine" when he was made a life peer.

Course
The River Maine rises in the Glens of Antrim, flowing through Ballymena and Randalstown before entering Lough Neagh.

Wildlife
The River Maine is a noted salmon and trout fishery.

References

See also
Rivers of Ireland

Rivers of County Antrim